George Morgan Plumb (April 12, 1913 – August 1, 1971)  was a Canadian wrestler. He competed in the men's freestyle lightweight at the 1948 Summer Olympics.

References

1913 births
1971 deaths
Canadian male sport wrestlers
Olympic wrestlers of Canada
Wrestlers at the 1948 Summer Olympics
Sportspeople from Toronto
Commonwealth Games medallists in wrestling
Commonwealth Games silver medallists for Canada
Wrestlers at the 1950 British Empire Games
20th-century Canadian people
Medallists at the 1950 British Empire Games